Hix was an unincorporated community in McDowell County, West Virginia.

References 

Unincorporated communities in West Virginia
Geography of McDowell County, West Virginia
Ghost towns in West Virginia